KOK Baptist Association (KOKBA) is a Kokborok speaking Baptist community in Tripura. It is located within the Khowai district of Tripura in India. It has around 3,800 communicant members in 60 churches.

History
The KOKBA was established in the year 1990.

Organization
The Association is led by the Executive Secretary. The Association is registered under the TBCU.

Workers of KOKBA
The workers of Central Baptist Association have been grouped mainly into five categories as below:
 Pastor
 Pro-Pastor
 Ordained Evangelist
 Evangelist
 Office Worker

Pastors of KOKBA
The pastors of the KOKBA are:
 
 Rev. Sunil Debbarma

Ordained Evangelists of KOKBA

 Ord. Evan. Suran Pada Kalai
 Ord. Evan. Dharmendra Debbarma
 Ord. Evan. Samaresh Debbarma

Evangelists of KOKBA

 Evan. Mangthar Debbarma
 Evan. Ahlem Debbarma
 Evan. Philip Rupini
 Evan. Kishore Debbarma
 Evan. Manoj Kumar Debbarma
 Evan. Sanjoy Debbarma
 Evan. Ranju Debbarma
 Evan. Utpal Debbarma
 Evan. Biresh Debbarma

Affiliated Churches
The affiliated churches with foundation date are listed below according to 2010 census:

 Chandranath (1974)
 Pointram (1979)
 Gorjung (1980)
 Moglam (1980)
 Gwngrai (1981)
 Jiten (1982)
 Madharam (1984)
 Anath Chowdhury (1985)
 Belchara (1988)
 Ghilatoli (1989)
 Basanta Kobra (1990)
 Khakchangma (1990)
 Maharani (1991)
 Thagur (1991)
 Chhanlwng (1992)
 Dophidar (1993)
 Gairing (1994)
 Sumanta (1994)
 Tagla (1994)
 Bathaka (1994)
 Chargoria (1994)
 Khowai Town (1994)
 Mosok Kami (1995)
 Bokomnia (1996)
 Yakhrai (1998)
 Bishnu Ram Sipai (1999)
 Mudilenga (1999)
 Lampra (2001)
 Monaikhor (2002)
 Kami Kwchar (2002)
 Uahlwng (2002)
 Bolitali (2003)
 Tulasikhor (2003)
 Behalabari (2003)
 Capital (2003)
 Haruaktali (2004)
 Twisa rangchak (2005)
 Baikuntho (2006)
 Balua (2006)
 Goyamphang (2006)
 Nisan (2007)
 Manik Chowdhury (2007)
 Athuk Twisa (2007)
 Mwtai Kami (2007)
 Naithok (2007)
 Tingaria (2007)
 Marchaduk (2007)
 Khaswrang (2008)
 Akhara (2009)
 Ampura (2009)
 Thailik Bwlwng (2009)
 Jalai Twisa (2009)
 Petra Kami (2009)
 Mayung kwthwi (2009)
 Tokchaya (1988)
 Sipai Hour (1992)
 Padmabil (2006)
 Harepkuar (2004)
 Mungia (1996)
 Bidhyabil (1990)

See also
 Tripura Baptist Christian Union
 Baptist World Alliance

References 
 Debbarma, Sukhendu (1996) Origin and Growth of Christianity in Tripura: With Special Reference to the New Zealand Baptist Missionary Society, 1938-1988, Indus Publishing, New Delhi. 
 Borok Baptist Convention, Rangchak Mukumu, 2010

External links
 Baptist World Alliance

Baptist Christianity in Tripura